Viktoria Shklover (born 18 January 1984) is an Estonian pair skater.

Early in her career, she competed with Aleksandr Bulogin. From 1998 through 2002, she competed with Valdis Mintals. They were the 1998-2002 Estonian national champions. They competed twice at the World Junior Championships, and three times at the World and European Championships. Their highest placement at an ISU Championship was 10th at the 2000 and 2001 European Championships.

Programs 
(with Mintals)

Results 
(with Mintals)

References

External links
 

Estonian female pair skaters
1984 births
Sportspeople from Kyiv
Living people